Coleophora longicornuta is a moth of the family Coleophoridae.

References

Longicornuta
Moths described in 1998